In the 2017–18 season, Espérance Sportive de Tunis competed in the Ligue 1 for the 63rd season, as well as the Tunisian Cup.  It was their 65th consecutive season in the top flight of Tunisian football. They competed in Ligue 1, the Champions League, the Arab Club Champions Cup and the Tunisian Cup.

Squad list
Players and squad numbers last updated on 18 November 2017.Note: Flags indicate national team as has been defined under FIFA eligibility rules. Players may hold more than one non-FIFA nationality.

Pre-season

Competitions

Overview

{| class="wikitable" style="text-align: center"
|-
!rowspan=2|Competition
!colspan=8|Record
!rowspan=2|Started round
!rowspan=2|Final position / round
!rowspan=2|First match
!rowspan=2|Last match
|-
!
!
!
!
!
!
!
!
|-
| Ligue 1

| 
| style="background:gold;"| Winners
| 15 August 2017
| 10 May 2018
|-
| Tunisian Cup

| colspan=2| Round of 32
| colspan=2| 4 February 2018
|-
| 2017 Champions League

| colspan=2| Quarter-finals
| 16 September 2017
| 23 September 2017
|-
| 2018 Champions League

| Preliminary round
| style="background:gold;"|  Winners
| 10 February 2018
| 9 November 2018
|-
| Club Champions Cup

| Group stage
| style="background:gold;"| Winners
| 24 July 2017
| 6 August 2017
|-
! Total

Ligue 1

League table

Results summary

Results by round

Matches

Tunisian Cup

2017 Champions League

Knockout stage

Quarter-finals

2018 Champions League

Preliminary round

First round

Group stage

Group A

Club Championship Cup

Group stage

Group C

Semi-finals

Final

Squad information

Playing statistics

|-
! colspan=14 style=background:#dcdcdc; text-align:center| Goalkeepers

|-
! colspan=14 style=background:#dcdcdc; text-align:center| Defenders

|-
! colspan=14 style=background:#dcdcdc; text-align:center| Midfielders

|-
! colspan=14 style=background:#dcdcdc; text-align:center| Forwards

|-
! colspan=14 style=background:#dcdcdc; text-align:center| Players transferred out during the season

Goalscorers
Includes all competitive matches. The list is sorted alphabetically by surname when total goals are equal.

Transfers

In

Out

Notes

References 

2017-18
Tunisian football clubs 2017–18 season